"End of Sorrow" is the seventh single by Japanese rock band Luna Sea, released on March 25, 1996. The song was the band's third number 1 on the Oricon Singles Chart, and charted for eight weeks. In 1996, it was certified Platinum by the RIAJ for sales over 400,000. This single version of "End of Sorrow" is slightly different from the one that appears on the album, Style. The song was covered by Yu-Ki & DJ Koo from the band TRF for 2007's Luna Sea Memorial Cover Album -Re:birth-.

Track listing
All songs written and composed by Luna Sea.

"End of Sorrow" - 4:24Originally composed by Sugizo.
"Twice" - 6:16Originally composed by Inoran.

References

Luna Sea songs
Oricon Weekly number-one singles
1996 singles
1996 songs